
St. Catherine Adult Correctional Centre, Jamaica, formerly Saint Catherine District Prison and sometimes called Spanish Town Prison, was built to accommodate 850 male inmates but has held over 1300 on occasions. It contains the only death-row on the island.

It is operated by the Department of Correctional Services for the Ministry of National Security

See also

List of prisons in Jamaica
Capital punishment in Jamaica

External links
Aerial view.
Photos:

References

Prisons in Jamaica
Buildings and structures in Saint Catherine Parish
Spanish Town